Blair Strang (born 15 March 1972) is a New Zealand Maori actor. He is most noted for playing ambulance driver Rangi Heremaia on New Zealand's longest-running soap opera, Shortland Street, between 1995 and 2001 and Brian King on Nothing Trivial from 2011 to 2014.

Early life
Born to a Pākehā father of English descent and a Māori mother, he attended Saint Kentigern College, Pakuranga, where he was Head Prefect.

Filmography
 Falling Inn Love – Anaaki
 Nothing Trivial – Brian King
 Kaitangata Twitch – Sebastian Cardwell
 Shortland Street – Rangi Heremaia
 Go Girls – Joseph
 Doves of War – Joe Matich
 Orange Roughies – D.S. Sean Parkes
 So You Wanna Be a Popstar? – a singer
 Power Rangers S.P.D. – Bork (voice)
 Maiden Voyage: Ocean Hijack – Enrique
 Deceit – Karl
 Mataku – Uncle Eru (Season 1 Episode 3: Going to War)
 Best Bits – Himself
 Happy Birthday 2 You – Paramedic Rangi Heremia
 Look Who's Famous Now – Himself
 Interrogation
 Homeland
 Power Rangers Dino Fury – Warden Carlos Garcia

Career
As well as Shortland Street, Strang has appeared in television dramas Doves of War (for TV3), Orange Roughies (TV 1), Interrogation (Prime TV), Go Girls and Nothing Trivial. He also made an appearance on So You Wanna be a Popstar?, hosted by Oliver Driver, and starring Katrina Hobbs, and regularly appears in a variety of roles as a guest star or extra.

He completed filming Māori Television's new family drama, Kaitangata Twitch, which is an adaption of the children's book by author, Margaret Mahy. He has also completed a successful New Zealand tour of the theatre piece, Whero's New Net and co starred in the TV drama Nothing Trivial and Homeland.

Personal life
He has an LLB from the University of Auckland, majoring in entertainment law, and is a practising family lawyer in Albany at North Shore Legal Chambers.

He married his former Shortland Street co-star Katrina Devine on 10 November 2001; the couple later divorced.

Awards
In 2008 he won Metro magazine's "Outstanding Performance of the Year" award in a theatre piece with Massive Theatre Company called Whero's New Net.

External links

References

1972 births
Living people
New Zealand male television actors
New Zealand male soap opera actors
University of Auckland alumni
New Zealand male Māori actors
People educated at Saint Kentigern College
20th-century New Zealand male actors
21st-century New Zealand male actors